Woosung may refer to:
 Wusong District, an area of Shanghai, China formerly transliterated as Woosung
 Suzhou Creek, a small river formerly also known as Woosung River
 Woosung, Illinois, a town in United States named after Wusong, China. 
 Woosung (name), a Korean male given name